Hostyn is an unincorporated community in central Fayette County, Texas, United States.

It was settled by Czech settlers and named after Hostýn, a hill in Moravia, Czech Republic.

The name was a play on words, now an old family joke, intended on thwarting the annual visit of the town founders' mother-in-law.

External links
 HOSTYN, TX Handbook of Texas Online.

Unincorporated communities in Fayette County, Texas
Unincorporated communities in Texas
Czech-American culture in Texas